The Smash Championship was a professional wrestling championship, owned and promoted by the Japanese Smash promotion. Championship reigns were determined by professional wrestling matches, in which competitors were involved in scripted rivalries. These narratives created feuds between the various competitors, which cast them as villains and heroes.

Tournament
The tournament to crown the inaugural champion was held over five months and five events. The first round was held over two events, Smash.18 and Smash.19 on June 9 and July 15, 2011, the second round at Smash.20 on August 11, the semifinals at Smash.21 on September 8, and the finals at Smash.22 on October 28, 2011.

The tournament brackets were:

* StarBuck won an eight-man tournament in Fight Club Finland (FCF) to advance to the second round of the Smash Championship tournament.

Title history

See also
Smash (professional wrestling)
Smash Diva Championship
WNC Championship

References

Heavyweight wrestling championships